Victoria Lovelady  (born 29 November 1986) is a Brazilian professional golfer.

Lovelady qualified for the 2016 Summer Olympics.

Early life and amateur golf career
Victoria Alimonda, now known as Victoria Lovelady after marriage, began playing golf at the age of 12. She also enjoys playing the guitar, composing music and surfing.

Professional career
Lovelady played on the Symetra Tour in 2012 and 2013 and has played on the Ladies European Tour since 2014.

References

External links

Brazilian female golfers
Ladies European Tour golfers
Olympic golfers of Brazil
Golfers at the 2016 Summer Olympics
1986 births
Living people